Suzanne, Suzanne is a 1982 short documentary film about a young African-American woman coming to terms with personal and family struggles. The film was directed by Camille Billops and James Hatch and is semi-autobiographical, based on Billops' niece, Suzanne.

Summary 
The film focuses on Suzanne, Billops’s niece, and her mother, Billie, whose relationship has been strained and accordingly mediated by their shared, but largely unspoken experience of abuse at the hands of the late family patriarch, Brownie. Suzanne, a recovering heroin addict, details the emotional and physical trauma of her childhood as part of the keys to understanding her own self-destruction.

Background 
Suzanne, Suzanne (1982) is a seminal documentary co-directed by partners in life and work, Camille Billops and James Hatch. 

Billops and Hatch’s intellectual and artistic partnership dates back to LA in the early 1960s, when Billops was a student at Los Angeles City College at the same time that Hatch taught theater arts at UCLA. After Hatch’s Fulbright Fellowship took the couple to Egypt in 1962—and later India, Taiwan, Malaysia, and Thailand—Billops reoriented her practice away from her early projects in sculpture, ceramics, and painting to, instead, focus more on collaborative filmmaking with Hatch through their shared production company, Mom and Pop Productions. Upon re-establishing their home base in New York City, they took on the work of formalizing their monumental personal archive, the Hatch-Billops Collection, dedicated to preserving the material memory of Black history, culture, and visual and performing arts in America. 

Made in 1982, Suzanne, Suzanne is the first of three films in Billops and Hatch’s Family Trilogy—which also includes Finding Christa (1991) and String of Pearls (2002).

Accolades 
In 2016, the film was selected for preservation in the United States National Film Registry by the Library of Congress as being "culturally, historically, or aesthetically significant".

See also 
1982 in film
Drug abuse

References

External links 
 
 
 Suzanne, Suzanne on TCM.com

1982 films
African-American films
United States National Film Registry films
Films about child abuse
Films about drugs
1980s English-language films
American short documentary films
1980s American films